In mathematics, a developable surface (or torse: archaic) is a smooth surface with zero Gaussian curvature.  That is, it is a surface that can be flattened onto a plane without distortion (i.e. it can be bent without stretching or compression).  Conversely, it is a surface which can be made by transforming a plane (i.e. "folding", "bending", "rolling", "cutting" and/or "gluing"). In three dimensions all developable surfaces are ruled surfaces (but not vice versa). There are developable surfaces in four-dimensional space  which are not ruled.

The envelope of a single parameter family of planes is called a developable surface.

Particulars

The developable surfaces which can be realized in three-dimensional space include:

Cylinders and, more generally, the "generalized" cylinder; its cross-section may be any smooth curve
Cones and, more generally, conical surfaces; away from the apex
 The oloid and the sphericon are members of a special family of solids that develop their entire surface when rolling down a flat plane.
 Planes (trivially); which may be viewed as a cylinder whose cross-section is a line
Tangent developable surfaces; which are constructed by extending the tangent lines of a spatial curve.
 The torus has a metric under which it is developable, which can be embedded into three-dimensional space by the Nash embedding theorem and has a simple representation in four dimensions as the Cartesian product of two circles: see Clifford torus.

Formally, in mathematics, a developable surface is a surface with zero Gaussian curvature.  One consequence of this is that all "developable" surfaces embedded in 3D-space are ruled surfaces (though hyperboloids are examples of ruled surfaces which are not developable).  Because of this, many developable surfaces can be visualised as the surface formed by moving a straight line in space.  For example, a cone is formed by keeping one end-point of a line fixed whilst moving the other end-point in a circle.

Application

Developable surfaces have several practical applications.  

Developable Mechanisms are mechanisms that conform to a developable surface and can exhibit motion (deploy) off the surface. 

Many cartographic projections involve projecting the Earth to a developable surface and then "unrolling" the surface into a region on the plane.  

Since developable surfaces may be constructed by bending a flat sheet, they are also important in manufacturing objects from sheet metal, cardboard, and plywood. An industry which uses developed surfaces extensively is shipbuilding.

Non-developable surface 

Most smooth surfaces (and most surfaces in general) are not developable surfaces. Non-developable surfaces are variously referred to as having "double curvature", "doubly curved", "compound curvature", "non-zero Gaussian curvature", etc.

Some of the most often-used non-developable surfaces are:

 Spheres are not developable surfaces under any metric as they cannot be unrolled onto a plane.
 The helicoid is a ruled surface – but unlike the ruled surfaces mentioned above, it is not a developable surface.
 The hyperbolic paraboloid and the hyperboloid are slightly different doubly ruled surfaces – but unlike the ruled surfaces mentioned above, neither one is a developable surface.

Applications of non-developable surfaces 

Many gridshells and tensile structures and similar constructions gain strength by using (any) doubly curved form.

See also

Development (differential geometry)
Developable roller

References

External links

 
 Examples of developable surfaces on the Rhino3DE website

Surfaces
Differential geometry
Differential geometry of surfaces